Riding High is a television series from New Zealand. The series is based on the comics of the German  magazine.

Plot 
The 15 year old Wendy Thorburn lives on the Lindentree horse farm. She takes care of the horses and has a lot of adventures with her friends.

Overview 
Riding High is based on the comics of the German Wendy magazine. The series was filmed in New Zealand and premiered on television on December 31, 1995 on TV2.
The series was translated into German and Italian. From 1996 to 1998 the German Franz Schneider publisher published nine books based on the television series.

Riding High is not the only TV series based on the Wendy comics. A second series, Wendy, based on the comics, was published in 2013. It is an animated series.

Cast

Reception 
Riding High was well received by viewers in Germany. The series was still repeated on German television years after it was first broadcast.

Antje Wessels praises the luxurious landscape shots and exciting scenes from the everyday life with the horses. However, the series is orientated more towards older children and teenagers. Therefore, it is less suitable for the very young viewers and more for the whole family. The series covers topics such as horses, friendship, love and growing up.

Lisa Ludwig from Moviepilot adds that Riding High is the perfect mixture of a daily soap, Gossip Girl, 90s nostalgia and riding stable romance. She also praises Karl Urban's performance as Jerry Kiesemann (James Westwood).

Lorella Joschko thinks the series has depth and at the same time lots of fun and joy. The series is her absolute highlight.

Julia Fahl thinks that the Wendy series is a must see for horse fans. As a teenager she was particularly fascinated by the horse Miss Dixie.

See also
Wendy (2013), another TV series based on the Wendy magazine

References

External links
 

1996 New Zealand television series endings
1995 New Zealand television series debuts
1990s romance television series
1990s teen drama television series
Television series about teenagers
Television shows filmed in New Zealand
Television shows based on comics
Television series by South Pacific Pictures